The 2018–19 Weber State Wildcats men's basketball team represented Weber State University during the 2018–19 NCAA Division I men's basketball season. The Wildcats were led by 13th-year head coach Randy Rahe and played their home games in the Dee Events Center in Ogden, Utah as members of the Big Sky Conference. They finished the season 18–15, 11–9 in Big Sky play to finish in a three-way tie for fourth place. They defeated Portland State in the quarterfinals of the Big Sky tournament to advance to the semifinals where they lost to Montana.

Previous season
The Wildcats finished the 2017–18 season 20–11, 13–5 in Big Sky play to finish in a tie for third place. They lost in the quarterfinals of the Big Sky tournament to Northern Colorado.

Offseason

Departures

2018 recruiting class

2019 recruiting class

Roster

Schedule and results

|-
!colspan=9 style=| Exhibition

|-
!colspan=9 style=| Non-conference regular season

|-
!colspan=9 style=| Big Sky regular season

|-
!colspan=9 style=|Big Sky tournament

References

Weber State Wildcats men's basketball seasons
Weber State
Weber State Wildcats men's basketball
Weber State Wildcats men's basketball